The Citrus County Sheriff's Office (CCSO) is the primary law enforcement agency servicing a population of 138,143 in  of Citrus County, Florida.

History
The sheriff's office began operations on June 2, 1887, when Citrus County was created with the signature of Governor Edward A. Perry.

In 2005, the Citrus County Sheriff's Office made national headlines with its investigation of the gruesome rape and murder of Jessica Lunsford, a 9-year-old Homosassa girl.

Organization
The current sheriff is Mike Prendergast. The CCSO is divided into two bureaus:

The Law Enforcement Bureau oversees the patrol, criminal investigation, and emergency management divisions, and the Administrative Bureau oversees judicial services, staff, finance, human resources (recruiting), and information services, as well as special projects personnel.

See also

List of U.S. state and local law enforcement agencies
Sheriff (Florida)

References

External links
Citrus County Sheriff's Office official website
Citrus County government official website

Sheriff's Office
Sheriffs' departments of Florida
1887 establishments in Florida